Schmitt is a German surname. Notable people with the surname include:

A–K
 Adam Schmitt (born 1968), American singer/songwriter
 Al Schmitt (1930–2021), American recorded music engineer
 Alain Schmitt (born 1983), French judoka
 Alfred Schmitt (1907–1973), French astronomer
 Allison Schmitt (born 1990), American Olympic swimmer
 Father Aloysius Schmitt (1909–1941), Roman Catholic priest who died at Pearl Harbor
 Antoine Schmitt (born 1961), French artist, programming engineer and designer
 Anton Schmitt (died 1916), German sailor killed during World War I
 Arnd Schmitt (born 1965), German fencer and Olympic champion
 Bernadotte Everly Schmitt (1886–1969), American historian
 Bernd Schmitt (born 1957), American scholar in marketing and business psychology
 C. L. Schmitt (1912–1993), Pennsylvania legislator
 Carl Schmitt (1888–1985), German intellectual, and jurist
 Carl Schmitt (artist) (1889–1989), American artist
 Conrad Schmitt (1867–1940), American artist and founder of Conrad Schmitt Studios in Wisconsin
 David P. Schmitt, psychologist
 Dennis Schmitt (born 1960), American explorer
 Donald Schmitt (born 1951), Canadian architect
 Ernesto Schmitt (born 1972), German/Uruguayan Entrepreneur
 Edgar Schmitt (born 1963), retired German football player
 Else Schmitt (1921–1995), German politician
 Eric Schmitt (born 1975), American politician from Missouri
 Eric P. Schmitt (born 1959), Pulitzer Prize–winning American journalist
 Éric-Emmanuel Schmitt (born 1960), French writer
 Erich Schmitt (1912–1979), Swiss field handball player
 Francis O. Schmitt (1903–1995), American scientist
 Florent Schmitt (1870–1958), French composer
 Frieda Schmitt-Lermann (born 1885), German composer
 Gary Schmitt (born 1952), American neo conservative political analyst
 Gladys Schmitt (1909–1972), American writer, editor, and college professor
 Graziella Schmitt (born 1981), Brazilian actress
 Harrison Schmitt (born 1935), American former astronaut and New Mexico Senator; twelfth man to walk on the Moon
 Hugo Schmitt (1904-1977), German-American elephant trainer
 Hélène Schmitt, prize-winning French violinist
 Ingo Schmitt, German politician
 Janis Schmitt (born 1947), American model and actress
 Jean-Claude Schmitt (born 1946), French medievalist
 Jim Schmitt (born 1958), American politician from Wisconsin
 Johan Schmitt (1881–1955), Dutch gymnast
 John Schmitt (economist) (born 1962), American economist
 John Schmitt (American football) (born 1942), American football player
 John Schmitt (rower) (1901–1991), American Olympic rower
 Joseph Schmitt (1734–1791), German/Dutch composer, conductor, music director, publisher, music theorist and pedagogue
 Julie Schmitt (1913–2002), German Olympic gymnast
 Justin Schmitt (born 1974), Australian rules football field umpire
 Kurt Schmitt (1886–1950), German economic leader

L–Z
 Logan Giulietti-Schmitt (born 1985), American ice dancer
 Ludwig Schmitt (1902–1980), German chess master
 Mark Schmitt, American political scientist and author
 Mark Francis Schmitt (1923–2011), American Roman Catholic bishop
 Martin Schmitt (born 1978), German ski jumper
 Matías Schmitt (born 1991), Argentine snowboarder
 Michael N. Schmitt (born 1956), American law scholar
 Morgan Schmitt (born 1985), American road bicycle racing cyclist
 Owen Schmitt (born 1985), American football player
 Otto Schmitt (1913–1998), American inventor and biophysicist
 Otto Schmitt (field hockey) (born 1965), Argentine field hockey goalkeeper
 Pál Schmitt (born 1942), ex-president of Hungary
 Pete Schmitt (born 1984), American football fullback
 Peter J. Schmitt (1950–2012), American politician from New York
 Philipp Schmitt (1902–1950), German SS commandant of Nazi prison camp executed for war crimes
 Ralf Schmitt (born 1977), German football player
 Ricky Schmitt (born 1985), American football punter
 Rob Schmitt (1986), American television journalist
 Rodolfo Schmitt (born 1974), former field hockey player from Argentina
 Roland W. Schmitt (1923–2017), American physicist, business executive and president of Rensselaer Polytechnic Institute
 Rudolf Schmitt (1830–1898), German chemist and co-discoverer of the Kolbe-Schmitt reaction
 Sebastian Schmitt (born 1996), German basketball player
 Sven Schmitt (born 1976), German football player
 Tchavolo Schmitt (born 1954), guitarist in gypsy jazz
 Ted Schmitt (1916–2001), American football player
 Thilo Schmitt (born 1982), German slalom canoer
 Thorsten Schmitt (born 1975), German Olympic skier
 Tyler Schmitt (born 1986), American football long snapper
 Waldo L. Schmitt (1887–1977), American biologist

See also 
 Schmidt (disambiguation)
 Schmit, a surname
 Schmitt Brothers, barbershop quartet
 Schmitten (disambiguation)

German-language surnames
Occupational surnames